The Hejaz Expeditionary Force of the Ottoman Empire was one of the expeditionary forces of the military of the Ottoman Empire. Its commander had the authority of an army commander. It was formed during World War I for the defense of Medina (located in the region known as the Hejaz).

Fahreddin Pasha was appointed to the commander of the Hejaz Expeditionary Force on 17 July 1916. The principal unit of this force, the Medina garrison itself. And the Hejaz Expeditionary Force consisted of 14,000 men by the fall of 1916.

Order of battle
In 1916, the Hejaz Expeditionary Force was structured as follows:

Hejaz Expeditionary Force HQ (Medina, Commander: Ferik Fahreddin Pasha)
1st Camel Regiment (1 nci Hecinsüvar Alayı)
1st Volunteer Cavalry Regiment (1 nci Akıncı Alayı)
Field artillery batteries x 3
Signal companies x 2
Medical and logistical support elements

Sources

Expeditionary Forces of the Ottoman Empire
Military units and formations of the Ottoman Empire in World War I
Ottoman Arabia
History of Medina